Viscount  was the 13th and final daimyō of Kashima Domain in Hizen Province, Kyūshū, Japan (modern-day Saga Prefecture). Before the Meiji Restoration, his courtesy title was Bizen no Kami. He became a politician in the Meiji era, and served as the first governor of Okinawa Prefecture.

Biography 
Born in the Kashima Domain in Hizen Province, Naoyoshi was the 3rd son of the 10th daimyō of Kashima, . In 1848, the 13th daimyō of Kashima, went into forced retirement under strong pressure from Nabeshima Naomasa due to fiscal mismanagement, and the title went to Naoyoshi. During the early part of his administration, Kashima's financial affairs were so dire that they came to be entirely handled by the main Saga Domain, and in 1851 Naoyoshi even proposed that the domain be abolished and absorbed into Saga. He was opposed by the other branches of the Nabeshima clan (i.e. Hasunoike Domain and Ogi Domain.

In 1853, Kashima Domain had a further financial burden imposed when the Tokugawa shogunate assigned it responsibility for security during the visit of Russian diplomat Yevfimy Putyatin to Nagasaki as part of Russia’s efforts to end Japan's national isolation policy and to establish commercial and diplomatic relations.

From 1860, Naoyoshi began secret discussions with representatives of the Imperial court and became a supporter of the movement to overthrow the Tokugawa regime. In 1866 he protected Soejima Taneomi, who was being hunted by the Shogunate. In 1868, with the start of the Boshin War, he pledged Kashima domain in support of the Satchō Alliance and Emperor Meiji.

In June 1869, the title of daimyō was abolished, and Naoyoshi was appointed domain governor. However, in 1871, Kashima Domain itself was abolished with the abolition of the han system, and became part of the new Saga Prefecture. Naoyoshi subsequently relocated to Tokyo.

From August 1872 to 1876, Naoyoshi traveled to the United States. On his return, he served as an advisor to Emperor Meiji, and traveled in the retinue of the Emperor to Kyoto in 1877, during the Satsuma Rebellion. From 1878, he was appointed an official tutor to the Emperor under the Imperial Household Ministry.

Following the 1879 abolition of the Ryūkyū Kingdom and its annexation by Japan as Okinawa Prefecture, Naoyoshi was appointed the prefecture's first governor, arriving there aboard the Tokai-maru on May 18, 1879.

Under his administration, the national public education system began to be implemented in Okinawa, with a particular focus on teaching the standard Japanese language, which very few in the islands could speak at that time. Many schools were established during the period of Naoyoshi's administration, and the prefecture's economic production was increased, particularly in the area of sugar production.

In 1881, Naoyoshi was recalled to Tokyo, and became president of the Genrōin.

In his later years he helped build hospitals and schools in the region of Kashima, which he had once ruled, and was awarded Second Court rank shortly before his death in 1915.

References 
 The content of much of this article was derived from that of the corresponding article on Japanese Wikipedia.
 Jurita, Shunjiro (1884). Who's who in Japan. (Tokyo:n.p.), p. 391.
 "Nabeshima Naoyoshi." Okinawa rekishi jinmei jiten (沖縄歴史人名事典, Encyclopedia of People of Okinawan History). Naha: Okinawa Bunkasha, 2002. p58.

|-

1844 births
1915 deaths
Kazoku
Members of the House of Peers (Japan)
Nabeshima clan
People of Meiji-period Japan
Tozama daimyo
Governors of Okinawa Prefecture